Album2  is a photo sharing website "for old local and family photos" launched in 2004, in Oslo, Norway by serial IT entrepreneur Sveinung Dammen. Album2.com makes it easy for people to share their old family photos with family and friends plus the local history club. The service helps to scan photos and add year plus smart tagging of grouped faces. Photo share is based on access control to photos by groups and relationships ensuring privacy and a photo sharing community under strict Norwegian law. According to the website, the name Album2.com has been used to reminds that a second digitalized copy of a family photo album that should always be on the Internet.

References

External links
 www.album2.com
 Photo Service Album2.no partner with Nettavisen article (in Norwegian) 

Internet properties established in 2004
Norwegian social networking websites
Photography websites